Kim Yong-un (September 6, 1927 – May 30, 2020) was a South Korean mathematician, philosopher, and critic of civilisations. He was active in various fields of mathematics, philosophy, anthropology, and linguistics, and is considered to have established the history of mathematics in Korea. He was a professor of mathematics at Hanyang University.

Life 
Kim Yong-un was born in Tokyo, Japan in 1927. He was liberated in the year he entered Waseda University and returned to his father's hometown of Naju, Jeollanam-do in 1946. While working as a math teacher at Mokpo High School and Gwangju Jeil High School since 1947, he felt the need to popularize math and later wrote several popular math books. After teaching for more than 10 years, he earned a doctorate in science while studying in the United States and Canada.

In the late 1970s, he studied the history of mathematics, and since the 1980s, he has analyzed Korea and Japan in a comparative cultural way by combining mathematics and history. The original form, which means collective unconsciousness of the community, and the locality in which the community is located, were involved in the development of language and history. In 1983, he founded the Korean Mathematical History Association and became the first chairman, and in 1994, he participated in the development process of Ungjin Publishing (now Ungjin Thinkbig), a mathematics learning magazine brand of Ungjin Publishing (now Ungjin Thinkbig), along with his younger brother, Professor Kim Yong-guk of Hanyang University. This is also the predecessor of Thinkbig, a learning center brand of Ungjin. He wrote more than 150 books throughout his life.

Academic background 

 Bachelor's degree in mining at Waseda University in Japan (dropout)
 Bachelor's degree in mathematics at Chosun University
 Graduate School of Orburn University in the U.S. (Bachelor of Science)
 Graduate School of University of Alberta, Canada (Doctor of Science)

Career 

 Assistant Professor of University of Wisconsin (1962-1965)
 Visiting professor at Kobe University in Japan
 A visiting professor at Tokyo University in Japan
 Guest Professor of the Center for International Cultural Research in Japan
 Professor of Mathematics at Hanyang University (1969-1993)
 President of the Korean Mathematical History Society
 Professor emeritus of mathematics at Hanyang University (1994-current)
 Chairman of the Korea Broadcasting Culture Promotion Agency (2000-2003)
 Director of the Korean Mathematical and Cultural Institute

Books

References 

20th-century South Korean mathematicians
Academic staff of Hanyang University
Waseda University alumni
University of Alberta alumni
1927 births
2020 deaths
People from Tokyo
Historians of mathematics
South Korean philosophers
South Korean historians